The following is a timeline of the history of the city of Maputo, Mozambique (until 1976 known as Lourenço Marques).

Prior to 20th century
 1544 - Portuguese Lourenço Marques explores Maputo Bay.
 1787 - Fortress built by Portuguese.
 1885 - Vasco de Gama Gardens laid out.
 1892 - O Commercio de Lourenço Marques begins publication.
 1895 - Pretoria-Lourenço Marques railway built.
 1898 - Capital of Portuguese Mozambique moves to Lourenço Marques from the Island of Mozambique.

20th century

 1904
 Trams begin operating.
 Population: 9,849.
 1912 - Population: 13,353.
 1916 - Central Train Station built.
 1918 - O Brado Africano begins publication.
 1922 - Hotel Polano built.
 1934 - Arquivo Historico de Moçambique headquartered in city.
 1935 - Population: 47,390 (estimate).
 1940 - Maputo Airport terminal built.
 1944 - Cathedral of Our Lady of the Immaculate Conception built.
 1950 - Population: 93,516.
 1955 - Sport Lourenço Marques e Benfica formed.
 1961 - National Library of Mozambique established.
 1962 - Estudos Gerais Universitários de Moçambique established.
 1968 - Estádio Salazar inaugurated in Matola.

1970s-1990s

 1970
 Tempo magazine begins publication.
 Population: 383,775 urban agglomeration.
 1974 - 24 September: Mozambique Liberation Front in power.
 1974 - Alberto Massavanhane designated by FRELIMO as the first President of the Executive Council
 1975 - City becomes part of the People's Republic of Mozambique.
 1976
 3 February: City renamed "Maputo."
 Nationalization occurs.
 1977
 Bank of Mozambique, Mozambican Youth Organisation, and Centro Nacional de Documentação e Informação de Moçambique headquartered in city.
 February: City hosts African Conference on Cinema.
 1978 - City administration by "Câmara Municipal" (city council) replaced by "Conselho Executivo" (executive council).
 1980
 City granted provincial status.
 António Hama Thay becomes president of city executive council.
 1982 - Gaspar Horácio Mateus Zimba becomes president of city executive council.
 1983
 "Jobless" moved from city.
 23 May: Attack by South African Air Force.
 Alberto Massavanhane becomes president of city executive council.
 1985 - City joins the newly formed .
 1987
 7 September: Prisoner exchange.
 João Baptista Cosme becomes president of city executive council.
 1989 - Brazilian Cultural Center opens.
 1990
 Liga Muçulmana de Maputo football club founded.
 Population: 776,000 (urban agglomeration).
 1993 - Fórum Mulher founded.
 1996
 Maputo Development Corridor launched.
 Instituto Camões-Centro Cultural Português opens.
 1997
 Artur Hussene Canana becomes president of city executive council.
 Population: 966,837.
 2000
 Flood.
 July: City hosts Community of Portuguese Language Countries summit.
 Population: 1,096,000 (urban agglomeration).

21st century

 2003
 Maputo Port Development Company established.
 July: City hosts African Union assembly.
 Eneas da Conceição Comiche becomes president of municipal council.
 2006 - Dockanema film festival begins.
 2007
 Promaputo city infrastructure project launched.
 22 March: Arms depot explosion.
 Population: 1,111,638 (city); 1,766,184 (urban agglomeration).
 2008 - February: Economic riots.
 2009 - David Simango becomes president of municipal council.
 2010
 Maputo International Airport terminal opens.
 September: Economic unrest.
 2011
 Estádio do Zimpeto inaugurated.
 September: City hosts 2011 All-Africa Games.
 2012 - Maputo Private Hospital inaugurated.
 2013 - Aga Khan Academy established.
 2015 - Population: 1,241,702 (estimate).
 2017 - 2017 Lusophony Games to be held in Maputo.

See also
 History of Maputo
 List of newspapers in Maputo
 Portuguese Empire
 Timeline of Beira, Mozambique

References

This article incorporates information from the Portuguese Wikipedia.

Bibliography

Published in 19th century

Published in 20th century

Published in 21st century
 
 
 
 
 
 
 
 
 
  (Includes articles about Maputo)

External links

  (Bibliography of open access articles)
  (Images, etc.)
  (Images, etc.)
  (Bibliography)
  (Bibliography)
  (Bibliography)
 

Maputo
Maputo
Maputo
maputo
Years in Mozambique
History of Maputo
Maputo